The Day of Arafah is an Islamic holiday that falls on the 9th day of Dhu al-Hijjah of the lunar Islamic Calendar. It is the second day of both the Hajj pilgrimage and the Islamic holiday of Eid al-Adha. At dawn of this day, Muslim pilgrims will make their way from Mina to a nearby hillside and plain called Mount Arafat and the Plain of Arafat. It was from this site that the Islamic prophet Muhammad gave one of his last sermons in the final year of his life. Some Muslims hold that part of the Quranic verse announcing that the religion of Islam had been perfected was revealed on this day.

Location 

According to Islamic tradition, the hill is the place where the prophet Muhammad stood and delivered the Farewell Sermon to the Muslims who had accompanied him for the Hajj towards the end of his life.

Customs 

Lasting from noon through sunset, this is known as 'standing before God' (wuquf), one of the most significant rites of Hajj. At Masjid al-Namirah, pilgrims offer Zuhr (Dhohr) and Asr prayers together at noon time. A pilgrim's Hajj is considered invalid if they do not spend the afternoon on Arafat.

Arafah prayer 
As Husayn ibn Ali recited the prayer during the Hajj at Mount Arafat on 9 Dhu al-Hijjah, Shia Muslims during the Hajj recite the Arafah prayer from Zuhr prayer to sunset. This day is called prayer day, specially for people who stand on Mount Arafat. On the Day of Arafah, those who cannot make it to Mecca will go to other holy places such as mosques to recite Arafah prayer.

Fasting on the Day of Arafah 
Fasting on the Day of Arafah for non-pilgrims is a highly recommended Sunnah which entails a great reward; Allah forgives the sins of two years. It was narrated from Abu Qatadah that Muhammad was asked about fasting on the day of 'Arafah and he replied:

It expiates for the past and coming years.

Imam An-Nawawi mentioned in his book al-Majmu', "With regard to the ruling on this matter, Imam As-Shafi'i and his companions said: It is mustahabb (recommended) to fast on the day of Arafah for the one who is not in Arafah. As for the pilgrim who is present in Arafah, Imam As-Shafi'i in his book Al-Mukhtasar and his followers declared 'It is mustahabb (recommended) for him not to fast'."

Prohibiting the pilgrims from fasting on these days is a great mercy for them, for fasting will exert undue hardship on the person performing the hajj. Above all, Muhammad did not fast while he stood before Allah offering supplications in Arafah. On the other hand, those who are not performing their hajj may observe fasting to gain the merits of the blessed day.

In hadith 
Abu Qatada al-Ansari narrated that the prophet Muhammad was asked about fasting on the Day of Arafah, whereupon he said: It expiates the sins of the preceding year and the coming year. Also about fasting on the Ashura (10 Muharram) he said: It expiates the sins of the preceding year.

In Sahih Muslim it was narrated from Aisha that the prophet Muhammad said:

The people would fast on this day to get their bad deeds in the upcoming year, and the past year, taken away.

See also 
 Eid al-Fitr

References

External links 
 What is the Day of Arafah?
 4 Sunnah Acts for Zulhijjah, especially the Day of Arafah
 The Virtues of the Day of Arafa
 Article on "The day of Arafa"
 Arafah : The Day Before Eid

Islamic holy days
Islamic terminology

ca:Arafa